Lachmipersad Frederik "Fred" Ramdat Misier (28 October 1926 – 25 July 2004) was the 3rd President of Suriname, serving from 1982 to 1988.

Early life
He was born on 28 October 1926 in Paramaribo, Suriname. His parents were Rampargas Ramdat Misier 
and Ramkali Durgadulare.

Misier later met Hilda Doergadei Dewanchand (1924–2021), who was from Onverwacht.  They were married on 28 January 1953.  In 1958, the couple moved to the Netherlands, where Misier studied law at Utrecht University.

Political career
Before becoming president, Ramdat Misier served as a teacher, lawyer and president of the Court of Justice. Head of the military Dési Bouterse appointed Ramdat Misier third president of Suriname on 8 February 1982. As president, he oversaw the November 1987 democratic elections that elected Ramsewak Shankar to the presidency. Ramdat Misier was succeeded by Shankar in February 1988.

Death
Ramdat Misier died on 25 July 2004, at the age of 77. His death occurred at the country's capital, Paramaribo.  Former president Jules Wijdenbosch commented on Ramdat Misier's political career, saying "he has played a vital role in Suriname's new democratic gestation. He brought unprecedented developments for the country." He is survived by his spouse, Hilda Doergadei Dewanchand. Ramdat Misier's cremation was held on 30 July and was attended by a number of dignitaries, including Wijdenbosch and then president Ronald Venetiaan.

References 

1926 births
2004 deaths
People from Paramaribo
Presidents of Suriname
Surinamese judges
Surinamese Hindus
Surinamese politicians of Indian descent
Utrecht University alumni